February 8 - Eastern Orthodox liturgical calendar - February 10

All fixed commemorations below are observed on February 22 by Eastern Orthodox Churches on the Old Calendar.

For February 9, Orthodox Churches on the Old Calendar commemorate the Saints listed on January 27.

Feasts

 Leavetaking of the Presentation of our Lord.

Saints

 Hieromartyrs Marcellus, Bishop of Sicily, Philagrius, Bishop of Cyprus, and Pancratius, Bishop of Taormina, disciples of Apostle Peter (1st century)
  Martyrs Ammonius and Alexander of Cyprus, at Solia in Cyprus (c. 248-251)
 Saint Apollonia of Alexandria, martyr (249)
 Martyr Nicephorus of Antioch in Syria (c. 257)
 Venerable Romanus the Wonderworker, of Cilicia, near Antioch (5th century) (see also: November 27)
 Venerable Shio Mgvime of Georgia (6th century)  (see also: May 9)
 Hieromartyr Peter, Bishop of Damascus, by the sword (743 or 775)

Pre-Schism Western saints

 Martyr Alexander of Rome and thirty-eight other martyrs with him.
 Martyrs Ammon, Emilian, Lassa and Companions, a group of forty-four Christians martyred in Membressa in Africa.
 Martyrs Primus and Donatus, two Deacons in Lavallum in North Africa martyred by Donatists (362)
 Saint Nebridius, Bishop of Egara near Barcelona in Spain, a city since destroyed (c. 527)
 Saint Sabinus of Canosa, Bishop of Canosa in Apulia in Italy and Confessor, and a friend of St Benedict (c. 566)
 Saints Aemilianus and Bracchio, of Tours in Gaul (6th century)
 Saint Teilo (Theliau, Teilan, Dillo, Dillon), Bishop of Llandaff, Wales (6th century)
 Saint Einion Frenin (Eingan, Eneon, Anianus), a British prince who left Cumberland for Wales and became a hermit at Llanengan near Bangor (6th century)
 Saint Ansbert of Rouen, third abbot of Fontenelle Abbey and then Bishop of Rouen (c. 700)
 Saint Cuaran (Curvinus, Cronan), a bishop in Ireland, called 'the Wise' - on account of his knowledge of the canons - who hid his identity to become a monk at Iona, where he was recognised by St Columba (c. 700)
 Saint Alto of Altomünster, founder of Altomünster Abbey (c. 760)

Post-Schism Orthodox saints

 Venerable Pancratius, hieromonk of the Kiev Caves Monastery (13th century)
 Saints Gennadius (c. 1516) and Nicephorus (1557) monks, of Vazhe Lake, Vologda.

New martyrs and confessors

 New Hieromartyr Basil Ismailov, Archpriest, of Belorussia (1930)
 New Hieromartyr John Fryazinov, Priest (1938)

Other commemorations

 Uncovering of the relics (1805) of St. Innocent, Bishop of Irkutsk (1731)
 Uncovering of the relics (1992) of New Hiero-confessor Tikhon, Patriarch of Moscow and all Russia (1925)
 Repose of Maria, desert-dweller of Olonets (1860)

Icon gallery

Notes

References

Sources
 February 9 / 22. Orthodox Calendar (Pravoslavie.ru).
 February 22 / 9. Holy Trinity Russian Orthodox Church (A parish of the Patriarchate of Moscow).
 February 9. OCA - The Lives of the Saints.
 The Autonomous Orthodox Metropolia of Western Europe and the America. St. Hilarion Calendar of Saints for the year of our Lord 2004. St. Hilarion Press (Austin, TX). p. 14.
 The Ninth Day of the Month of February. Orthodoxy in China.
 February 9. Latin Saints of the Orthodox Patriarchate of Rome.
 The Roman Martyrology. Transl. by the Archbishop of Baltimore. Last Edition, According to the Copy Printed at Rome in 1914. Revised Edition, with the Imprimatur of His Eminence Cardinal Gibbons. Baltimore: John Murphy Company, 1916. pp. 42–43.
 Rev. Richard Stanton. A Menology of England and Wales, or, Brief Memorials of the Ancient British and English Saints Arranged According to the Calendar, Together with the Martyrs of the 16th and 17th Centuries. London: Burns & Oates, 1892. pp. 60–61.
Greek Sources
 Great Synaxaristes:  9 Φεβρουαρίου. Μεγασ Συναξαριστησ.
  Συναξαριστής. 9 Φεβρουαρίου. Ecclesia.gr. (H Εκκλησια Τησ Ελλαδοσ).
Russian Sources
  22 февраля (9 февраля). Православная Энциклопедия под редакцией Патриарха Московского и всея Руси Кирилла (электронная версия). (Orthodox Encyclopedia - Pravenc.ru).

February in the Eastern Orthodox calendar